Jiří Mahen (born: Antonín Vančura; 12 December 1882 – 22 May 1939) was a Czech novelist, playwright and essayist.

Life 
He was born Antonín Vančura, in Čáslav, to an old noble family of the Bohemian Brethren faith. In his grammar-school years he became an anarchist. He later studied linguistics of the Czech and German languages at Prague University. After 1910, he worked as a journalist for Lidové noviny, one of the leading Czech newspapers. In the 1920s, he became the director of Brno Municipal Library. In 1939, due to depression following Hitler's occupation of Czechoslovakia, he committed suicide on 22 May in Brno.

Mahenova knihovna (Mahen's Library, Brno City Library) is named after him.

Mahen was the cousin of the novelist Vladislav Vančura.

Work 
His most important texts are the novels Kamarádi svobody (Friends of Freedom) and Měsíc (The Moon), a novel involving poetism, the theatre plays Mrtvé moře (Dead sea), written in 1917, Jánošík (Janosik), in 1910, and Generace (Generation), in 1921. He was the author of many books of essays, of which Rybářská knížka (Fishermen's Book), written in 1921, is the best known.

References 
Bohuš Balajka: Přehledné dějiny literatury II. Prague: Fortuna, 2005.

See also 
 List of Czech writers

1882 births
1939 deaths
Czech male novelists
Czech male dramatists and playwrights
Czech male poets
20th-century Czech poets
20th-century Czech novelists
20th-century Czech dramatists and playwrights
20th-century male writers
People from Čáslav
Czech anarchists
Anarchist writers
Burials at Brno Central Cemetery
1939 suicides